Dead Bird or The Dead Bird may refer to:

"Dead Bird" (song), a song by Suede on their 2018 album The Blue Hour
Dead Bird (album), a 2009 album by Swiss folk rock group  77 Bombay Street
The Dead Bird (book), a children's book by Margaret Wise Brown
The Dead Bird, a former name of the defunct Australian newspaper The Arrow

See also
Dead Birds (disambiguation)